Pojarkovia is a genus of flowering plants in the sunflower family.

Species
accepted species
Pojarkovia pojarkovae (Schischk.) Greuter - Azerbaijan and Republic of Georgia

formerly included
 Pojarkovia macrophylla (M.Bieb.) Askerova - Synonym of Caucasalia macrophylla (M.Bieb.) B.Nord.
 Pojarkovia pauciloba (DC.) Askerova - Synonym of Iranecio paucilobus (DC.) B.Nord.
 Pojarkovia platyphylloides (Sommier & Levier) Askerova - Synonym of Caucasalia pontica (K.Koch) Greuter

References

Senecioneae
Flora of the Caucasus
Monotypic Asteraceae genera